Julia Santos is a fictional character from the ABC daytime drama, All My Children. She was portrayed by actress Sydney Penny from 1993 to 1996 as a series regular, with guest appearances in 1997 and 2002, and from 2005 to 2008. Julia's pairing with Keith Hamilton Cobb's Noah Keefer formed one of daytime's first interracial supercouples and was one of the most popular pairings of the 1990s.

Character history
Julia came to Pine Valley from Texas to live with her sister, Maria Santos. Soon after her arrival, a tornado struck the Pennsylvania town and Julia was struck by a falling chandelier that scarred her face. She ran away to Center City and into the arms of Noah Keefer, with whom she lived and eventually fell in love.

In one notable storyline, Julia became pregnant after being raped by Louie Greco, a drug dealer who lived nearby, and chose to have an abortion, despite considerable opposition from her devout Roman Catholic Mexican-American family. The relationship between a Hispanic Mestizo Julia and the African American Noah was also contentious in her family.

When Noah learned of Louie Greco's actions he chased him down and accidentally killed him. Noah was found guilty of his murder and the two escaped to Jamaica; Noah was eventually exonerated of the crime. After this ordeal the two eventually married, but two thugs who were after Noah's aunt Grace tried to end Julia's life. Julia then witnessed the attempted murder of Noah's sister Belinda and when she testified against her sister-in-law's attacker she had no other choice but to enter the witness protection program with Noah. The two quickly left Pine Valley in 1996 for somewhere in Northern California.

In 1997, Maria was presumed killed in a plane crash and Julia was allowed to return for her funeral. Five years later, in 2002, Maria was found alive and once again Julia returned to see her sister and they shared an emotional reunion.

Julia returned in 2005, following Noah's murder, and ended up avenging Noah's death by murdering Garret Williams in self-defense. Since then, she became the legal guardian of a little girl named Kathy whose parents were killed in a car accident, and embarked on an affair with Jamie Martin. This slowly turned into love, but the romance ended with Julia leaving town. She returned to Pine Valley to find that her ex-boyfriend had gone to Africa to work with Doctors Without Borders.

After Jamie's departure, Julia and Jack began a brief flirtation which infuriated Erica Kane.

Julia was offered the head-nurse job at a hospital in Australia and was planning on leaving Pine Valley. But before she could, on May 23, 2008, while at the wedding of Jesse and Angie Hubbard, Robert Gardner (Ray Gardner's brother) busted into the reception holding Angie at gunpoint. Gardner spotted Aidan Devane gunning for him out of the corner of his eye and fired off a wild shot in Aidan's direction. Gardner missed Aidan, but accidentally shot Julia. At the hospital, Joe Martin tells her that the wound lacerated her liver. Together with a steady internal bleed, Julia knew her chances of surviving were slim to none, even with surgery, and so she decided against it. Knowing that Kathy had lost her mother in the same hospital, she would not let Krystal, who travelled with her in the ambulance, get Kathy so she could say goodbye. She asked Krystal to call her sister Maria to come and take Kathy. In the hospital bed, in the presence of Joe and Krystal, Julia tearfully slipped away, speaking of her love for Kathy. Also, before she died, Dixie came and thanked her for taking care of Kate (Kathy). Dixie stated she wished Julia didn't have to go. After Dixie left, Julia realized Kathy would be all right. With this thought in mind, Julia died.

See also
List of supercouples

References

External links
Julia Santos's biography soapcentral.com
Soap Opera Digest Profile

All My Children characters
Fictional nurses
Television characters introduced in 1993
Female characters in television